Éric Delétang (born 5 February 1966 in Sidi Bel Abbès, Algeria) is a former French professional footballer. He played as a midfielder. Currently Éric is the manager of the under 16 Jordanian football team.

See also
Football in France
List of football clubs in France

References

External links
Eric Deletang profile at chamoisfc79.fr

1966 births
Living people
French footballers
Association football midfielders
Chamois Niortais F.C. players
AS Monaco FC players
FC Martigues players
Le Havre AC players
Olympique Alès players
FC Lorient players
Angers SCO players
FC Rouen players
Ligue 1 players
Ligue 2 players
People from Sidi Bel Abbès
Algerian footballers
French sportspeople of Algerian descent